Radoslav Lopašić (1830–1893) was a Croatian historian and member of the Yugoslav Academy of Sciences and Arts.

Lopašić was born on 20 May 1830 in Karlovac, Austrian Empire (modern-day Croatia). His father was Mirko Lopašić, at that time a mayor and a city judge, while his mother was Magdalena nee Dobrilović. After being educated in Karlovac and Zagreb, Lopašić began his career in city administration.

References

Sources 

 
 

1835 births
1893 deaths
19th-century Austrian historians
People from Karlovac